Below is a list of the 273 players who played for the East Germany national team from its foundation in 1952, until 1990 when it was merged with the West Germany team after German reunification.

List of players

See also
List of Germany international footballers
List of Germany international footballers 1908–1942

References

 
Association football player non-biographical articles